Caladenia ultima, commonly known as the late spider orchid, is a species of orchid endemic to the south-west of Western Australia. It has a single erect, hairy leaf and up to three creamy-yellow flowers with a red-striped labellum. It is one of the last spiders orchids to flower each year.

Description 
Caladenia ultima is a terrestrial, perennial, deciduous, herb with an underground tuber and a single erect, hairy leaf, 60–150 mm long and 2–4 mm wide. Up to three creamy yellow or pale lemon-yellow flowers 80–110 mm long and 60–90 mm wide are borne on a stalk 150–250 mm tall. The sepals have long, brown, thread-like tips. The dorsal sepal is erect, 60–80 mm long and about 2 mm wide. The lateral sepals are 60–80 mm long, about 3 mm wide and turn stiffly downwards. The petals are 50–75 mm long, 2–3 mm wide and turn slightly upwards. The labellum is 12–15 mm long, 7–9 mm wide and creamy-white with red stripes and blotches with the tip curled downwards. The sides of the labellum are serrated and there are two rows of anvil-shaped, white or creamy-white calli along the mid-line. Flowering occurs from late October to early December, making it one of the last spider orchids to flower each year.

Taxonomy and naming 
Caladenia ultima was first formally described in 2001 by Stephen Hopper and Andrew Phillip Brown from a specimen collected in the Stirling Range and the description was published in Nuytsia. The specific epithet (ultima) is a Latin word meaning "farthest" or "last" referring to the late flowering of this orchid.

Distribution and habitat 
The late spider orchid is found in the Stirling Range National Park and Mount Barker area in the Esperance Plains and Jarrah Forest biogeographic regions where it grows in low-lying areas that are wet in winter.

Conservation
Caladenia ultima is classified as "Priority Two" by the Western Australian Government Department of Parks and Wildlife, meaning that it is poorly known and known from only one or a few locations.

References 

ultima
Endemic orchids of Australia
Orchids of Western Australia
Plants described in 2001
Endemic flora of Western Australia
Taxa named by Stephen Hopper
Taxa named by Andrew Phillip Brown